Bruno Gramaglia (23 April 1919 – 2 November 2005) was an Italian footballer from Genoa, in Liguria, who played as a midfielder. He played club football for several Italian sides, most notably Napoli and Sampdoria; he is the joint-fourth highest all-time league appearance holder for Napoli, along with Attila Sallustro.

He was part of the Spezia squad which won the Campionato Alta Italia 1944 during World War II, it was recognised by the FIGC as a legitimate top level Italian Championship in 2002. Gramaglia died in Rapallo on 2 November 2005.

References

Italian footballers
Serie A players
Serie B players
S.S.C. Napoli players
U.C. Sampdoria players
Spezia Calcio players
1919 births
Footballers from Genoa
2005 deaths
Association football midfielders